"Tourist Trapped" is the first episode of the animated television series Gravity Falls. The episode was directed by John Aoshima and written by series creator Alex Hirsch. The episode premiered on Disney Channel on June 15, 2012, airing immediately after the premiere of the Disney Channel Original Movie Let It Shine.

In "Tourist Trapped", young twins Dipper (voiced by Jason Ritter) and Mabel Pines (Kristen Schaal), have recently arrived in Gravity Falls, Oregon, to stay at their great uncle Stan (Hirsch)'s tourist trap, the Mystery Shack. Mabel soon starts dating a boy named Norman (also Hirsch), but when Dipper discovers a hidden journal documenting the paranormal side of the town, he begins to believe that his sister might be dating a zombie.

Plot 
The episode starts with Dipper and Mabel speeding on a golf cart and being chased by a big monster. Dipper then narrates the episode from the part where the twin's parents decided to send them to Gravity Falls, Oregon where their great uncle Stan lives. Dipper was anxious about spending his entire summer working for his "Grunkle" in the Mystery Shack (a tourist trap and gift shop). However, as he hangs signs to promote the Mystery Shack, he stumbles onto a rusty machine hidden in a tree which opens a secret compartment where Dipper finds a book that has a golden hand with the number 3 on it and starts reading it. The book contains the secrets and wonders of the town of Gravity Falls. While reading, he learns that Mabel (who is trying to have an "epic summer romance") has a date with her new boyfriend, Norman. Looking through the book, Dipper thinks Norman is a zombie and starts catching them on film. Mabel is frustrated when Dipper notes his skepticism to her.

Whilst on a date in the middle of the forest, Norman shows who he really is: a bunch of gnomes (led by Jeff). After Mabel rejects the gnomes, they kidnap her and drag her deeper into the forest. Meanwhile, as Dipper watches the video he took, he finds a part of the video where Mabel's boyfriend's hand falls off. He quickly rushes into the forest to find Mabel, whilst riding on a golf cart (borrowed from the Shack). Shocked by the fact that Norman was a bunch of gnomes and not a zombie, he manages to rescue Mabel by knocking Jeff over via a shovel. Angered, Jeff calls the gnomes to form a giant gnome to capture Mabel. They are unable to evade the gnomes as they reach the Mystery Shack, in the process Dipper loses his hat. Mabel seems ready to surrender to the gnomes, agreeing to marry Jeff. However, she grabs a leaf blower (which she used to practice kissing) and blows away the gnomes.

Later that night, Stan allows them to take an item each from the gift shop for free: Dipper acquires a new hat and Mabel gets a grappling hook. As Dipper and Mabel prepare to sleep that night, Stan enters a hidden room behind the vending machine in the rec room, making sure that nobody can see him.

Voice cast 
 Jason Ritter as Dipper
 Kristen Schaal as Mabel
 Alex Hirsch as Grunkle Stan, Soos, Jeff and Gnomes
 Linda Cardellini as Wendy
 Keith Ferguson as Norman
 Fred Tatasciore as Hank
 Kimberly Mooney as Hank's Wife

Production and broadcasting 
"Tourist Trapped" was written by series creator Alex Hirsch and directed by John Aoshima. The episode premiered on Disney Channel in the United States on June 15, 2012, serving as a special preview of the series. Its premiere immediately followed the premiere of the Disney Channel Original Movie Let It Shine. The episode's premiere was seen by close to 3.4 million viewers. It got 267,000 viewers when it premiered in the UK and Ireland on July 20, 2012.

Reception 
Alasdair Wilkins of The A.V. Club gave "Tourist Trapped" a B+ rating, praising its "mature" feel in comparison to other animated series for children (bringing inspiration from The Simpsons, The X-Files, and Twin Peaks), the show's art style, along with the use of its paranormal themes for comedy: specifically citing a scene where Mabel is seen hoping that her "zombie" boyfriend Norman was a vampire (playing off the popularity of the Twilight series), followed by the "wonderfully absurd" reveal that Norman was actually a group of gnomes. However, the remainder of the episode was criticised for being too reliant on "random" humour. Wilkins also praised Kristen Schaal for her performance as Mabel; stating that the character had "the same gleeful lack of restraint and propensity for violence (at least when it comes to punching gnomes) that Schaal brings to Louise Belcher, with the crucial difference being that she’s not a complete sociopath." Wilkins felt that Mabel was "a goofy, happy-go-lucky preteen" with a level of enthusiasm that helped support many of the gags surrounding her in the episode and that she acted within the mindset of an actual 12-year-old in her dialogue as well. Jason Ritter's performance as Dipper was also praised for giving the character a panicked and suspicious view on the world around him, but it was noted that his voice sounded too old to be a 12-year-old.

"Tourist Trapped" received two nominations for the 40th Annie Awards, including Ian Worrel for Best Production Design in a Television/Broadcast Production, and Kristen Schaal for Best Voice Acting in an Animated Television/Broadcast Production.

International airdates
 September 5, 2012: Switzerland
 January 7, 2013: Germany
 February 24, 2014: Austria

References

External links

 

Gravity Falls episodes
2012 American television episodes
American television series premieres